Tudar-e Molla (also Romanized as Tūdār-e Mollā and Tūdār Mollā; also known as Tūtdār-e Mollā and Tu-yi-Dar Mullah) is a village in Kalatrazan Rural District, Kalatrazan District, Sanandaj County, Kurdistan Province, Iran. At the 2006 census, its population was 649, in 135 families. The village is populated by Kurds.

References 

Towns and villages in Sanandaj County
Kurdish settlements in Kurdistan Province